Jennifer Ann Bartz (born July 23, 1955), also known by her married name Jennifer McGillin, is an American former competition swimmer who represented the United States at the 1972 Summer Olympics in Munich, Germany.  Bartz competed in both individual medley events.  She finished fourth in the finals of the women's 200-meter individual medley with a time of 2:24.55.  She also advanced to the finals of the women's 400-meter individual medley, but again fell just short of a medal with a fourth-place performance with a time of 5:06.56.

Bartz attended the University of Miami in Coral Gables, Florida, and swam for the Miami Hurricanes swimming and diving team in National Collegiate Athletic Association (NCAA) competition.

See also
 List of University of Miami alumni

References

1955 births
Living people
American female medley swimmers
World record setters in swimming
Miami Hurricanes women's swimmers
Olympic swimmers of the United States
Sportspeople from Wilmington, Delaware
Swimmers at the 1972 Summer Olympics
20th-century American women